Ladakhis or Ladakhi people or Ladakspa are an ethnic group and first-language speakers of the Ladakhi language living in the Ladakh region in the northernmost part of Jammu Kashmir and Tibet in China. A small number of Ladakhis are also found in Baltistan, Pakistan.

History

Culture

Religion

References

Ladakh
Ethnic groups in India
Ethnic groups in Ladakh